The siege of Koppal (28 October 1790 – 7 April 1791) was conducted during the Third Anglo-Mysore War by forces of the Nizam of Hyderabad under the command of Mahabat Jung, assisted by a contingent of British East India Company forces.  The siege was poorly conducted, and the garrison surrendered principally because Bangalore had fallen in February 1791. The Siege of Koppal (28 October 1790 – 7 April 1791) was conducted during the Third Anglo-Mysore War by forces of the Nizam of Hyderabad under the command of Mahabat Jung, assisted by a contingent of British East India Company forces. The siege was poorly conducted, and the garrison surrendered principally because Bangalore had fallen in February 1791.

References
 Sen, Sailendra Nath. Anglo-Maratha relations, 1785-96
 History of the Madras Army, Volume 2

Koppal
Koppal
Koppal 1790
Koppal 1790
Koppal
Military history of India
1790 in India
1791 in India